Irma Angela Sofia Caldara (born 4 July 2000) is an Italian pair skater. With her skating partner, Riccardo Maglio, she has won four senior international medals, including gold at the 2022 Bavarian Open and 2022 Trophée Métropole Nice Côte d'Azur.

Career

Early years 
Caldara began learning to skate in 2006.

By 2014, she had teamed up with Edoardo Caputo to compete in junior pairs. Making their international debut, Caldara/Caputo took silver at the Lombardia Trophy in September 2014.

2015–16 season: Youth Olympics 
In September 2015, Caldara/Caputo competed at two 2015–16 ISU Junior Grand Prix (JGP) events, placing tenth at both. In February, they finished ninth in the pairs' event at the 2016 Winter Youth Olympics in Hamar, Norway. They were sixth in the team event, skating as members of Team Courage.

2016–17 season 
Caldara/Caputo took silver at the Lombardia Trophy, placed 15th at their JGP event in Germany, and then won silver at the NRW Trophy. In March 2017, the pair placed 15th at the 2017 World Junior Championships in Taipei.

2017–18 season 
Caldara/Caputo placed ninth at their JGP assignment in Belarus, then took gold at the Volvo Open Cup, held in November in Latvia. The latter was their final competition as a pair. They were coached by Tiziana Pagani in Milan.

2018–19 through 2020–21: Partnership with Santucci 
Caldara skated the next three seasons with Marco Santucci in senior pairs. The two made their international debut in February 2019, placing sixth at the Open Ice Mall Cup in Israel.

The following season, Caldara/Santucci skated at two Challenger Series events, placing 20th at both, and then finished fourth at the Italian Championships. In February 2020, they placed tenth at the Bavarian Open.

In their third and final season together, they made no international appearances. In December 2020, they withdrew from the Italian Championships after placing fourth in the short program.

2021–22 season: Debut of Caldara/Maglio 
Caldara began competing in partnership with Riccardo Maglio. The two placed tenth at their first international event, the Lombardia Trophy in September 2021, and fourteenth at the 2021 CS Golden Spin of Zagreb in December. In January, they took bronze at the Icelab International Cup before winning the Bavarian Open.

2022–23 season 
Caldara/Maglio won silver at the Lombardia Trophy in September and gold at the Trophée Métropole Nice Côte d'Azur in October. They were assigned to make their Grand Prix debut and finished in fifth place at the 2022 MK John Wilson Trophy. Caldara/Maglio then finished fourth at the 2022 NHK Trophy, 11.42 points back of bronze medalists McIntosh/Mimar of Canada.

Programs

With Maglio

With Caputo

Competitive highlights 
GP: Grand Prix; CS: Challenger Series; JGP: Junior Grand Prix

With Maglio

With Santucci

With Caputo

References

External links 
 
 
 
 

2000 births
Italian female pair skaters
Living people
Sportspeople from Milan